The XCOR Lynx was a proposed suborbital horizontal-takeoff, horizontal-landing (HTHL),
rocket-powered spaceplane that was under development by the California-based company XCOR Aerospace to compete in the emerging suborbital spaceflight market. The Lynx was intended to carry one pilot, a ticketed passenger, and/or a payload above  altitude. The concept was under development since 2003, when a two-person suborbital spaceplane was announced under the name Xerus.

In January 2016, XCOR changed plans for the first flight of the Lynx spaceplane. It was initially planned for the second quarter of 2016 from the Midland spaceport in Texas, but, in early 2016, it was pushed to an "undisclosed and tentative" date at the Mojave spaceport.

In May 2016, XCOR announced development of the Lynx had been halted with layoffs of approximately one-third of the staff; the company intended to concentrate on development of their liquid hydrogen rocket under contract with United Launch Alliance, instead.

Following the bankruptcy of XCOR Aerospace in 2017, the assets of the company were sold to the nonprofit organization Build A Plane, which will focus on education rather than suborbital flight.

History

Xerus
In 2003, XCOR proposed the Xerus (pronunciation: zEr'us) suborbital spaceplane concept. It was to be capable of transporting one pilot and one passenger as well as some science experiments. It would even be capable of carrying an upper stage which would launch near apogee and, therefore, would potentially be able to carry satellites into low Earth orbit. As late as 2007, XCOR continued to refer to their future two-person spaceplane concept as Xerus.

Lynx
The Lynx spaceplane was initially announced in March 2008, with plans for an operational vehicle within two years. The build of the Lynx Mark I flight article did not commence until mid-2013 and XCOR claimed that the first flight would take place in 2015. In November 2015, three co-founders left their existing positions with the company to start Agile Aero. Dan DeLong (Chief Engineer) and Aleta Jackson left the company entirely, while Jeff Greason, the former CEO, remained on the Board of Directors until he resigned in March 2016. Greason cited problems with the Lynx vehicle body, although the engine had been a success. As of mid 2016, development was suspended in favor of a ULA contracted hydrolox engine, the 8H21.

Passengers who had hoped to make flights in the Lynx included the winners from the Axe Apollo Space Academy contest and Justin Dowd of Worcester, Massachusetts, the winner of another contest called the Race for Space. Metro International's Race for Space newspaper contest. By July 2015, the passenger ticket was projected to cost .
As of December 2015, Kayak.com was reportedly selling tickets for flights on the XCOR Lynx starting in 2016.

In May 2016, the company halted development of the Lynx spaceplane and pivoted company focus toward development its LOX/LH2 engine technology, particularly on a funded project for United Launch Alliance. The company laid off more than 20 people of the 50–60 persons on board prior to May.

Description
The Lynx was intended to have four liquid rocket engines at the rear of the fuselage burning a mixture of LOX-Kerosene, each engine producing  of thrust.

Mark I Prototype
Maximum Altitude: 
Primary Internal Payload: 
Secondary payload spaces include a small area inside the cockpit behind the pilot or outside the vehicle in two areas in the aft fuselage fairing.
Aluminum LOX tank
 speed of ascent
4G re-entry loading

Mark II Production Model
Maximum Altitude: 
Primary Internal Payload: 
Secondary payload spaces include the same as the Mark I.
Non-toxic (non-hydrazine) reaction control system (RCS) thrusters, type 3N22
 Nonburnite LOX composite tank

Mark III

Lynx XR-5K18 engine
The XR-5K18 is a piston pump fed LOX/RP-1 engine using an expander cycle. The engine chamber and regenerative nozzle are cooled by RP-1

The development program of the XCOR Lynx 5K18 LOX/kerosene engine reached a major milestone in March 2011.  Integrated test firings of the engine/nozzle combination demonstrated the ability of the aluminum nozzle to withstand the high temperatures of rocket-engine exhaust.

In March 2011, United Launch Alliance (ULA) announced they had entered into a joint-development contract with XCOR for a flight-ready,  cryogenic LH2/LOX upper-stage rocket engine (see XCOR/ULA liquid-hydrogen, upper-stage engine development project).  The Lynx 5K18 effort to develop a new aluminum alloy engine nozzle using new manufacturing techniques would remove several hundred pounds of weight from the large engine leading to significantly lower-cost and more-capable commercial and US government space flights.

Airframe
It was reported in 2010 that the Mark I airframe could use a carbon/epoxy ester composite, and the Mark II a carbon/cyanate with a nickel alloy for the nose and leading-edge thermal protection.

Mark I build
The flight article Lynx Mark I was claimed as being fabricated and assembled in Mojave beginning in mid 2013. The cockpit of the Lynx (made of carbon fiber and designed by AdamWorks, Colorado) was reported as being one of the items that held up the assembly.

At the start of October 2014, the cockpit was attached to the fuselage. The rear carry-through spar was attached to the fuselage shortly after Thanksgiving 2014. At the beginning of May 2015, the strakes were attached to the airframe. The last major component, the wings, were expected to be delivered in late 2015. In January 2016, XCOR's CEO Jay Gibson said "…we anticipate the wings to be there in the very near future…" and the CTO Michael Valant said they were finding that calibrating the flaps was a challenge. In February 2016, the first prototype was described as a "wingless shell."

In XCOR's November 2016 news report, they stated that "Even though the program made great forward progress integrating the vehicle structural elements during 2015 and early 2016 the progress on the control surface elements lagged in design. In an effort to prevent potential rework resulting from implementing designs not yet mature the Lynx fabrication was paused, so our engineering team has gone back to the design board."

Test program
Tests of the XR-5K18 main engine began in 2008.

In February 2011, it was reported that engine tests were largely complete and the vehicle aerodynamic design had completed two rounds of wind tunnel testing. A third and final round of tests was completed in late 2011 using a "1/60-scale supersonic wind tunnel model of Lynx."

In October 2014, XCOR claimed that flight tests of the Mark I prototype would start in 2015. By January 2016, however, technical hurdles led the company to state that they had not assigned a new projected date for test flights.

Concept of operations

NASA sRLV program
In March 2011, XCOR submitted the Lynx as a reusable launch vehicle for carrying research payloads in response to NASA's suborbital reusable launch vehicle (sRLV) solicitation, which is a part of NASA's Flight Opportunities Program. No contract for providing this was ever announced.

Commercial operations
According to XCOR, the Lynx was intended to fly four or more times a day, and would have also had the capacity to deliver payloads into space. The Lynx Mark I prototype was expected to perform its first test flight in 2015, followed by a flight of the Mark II production model twelve to eighteen months afterwards.

XCOR had planned to have the Lynx's initial flights at the Mojave Air and Spaceport in Mojave, California or any licensed spaceport with a  runway. Media reports in 2014 anticipated that, by the end of 2015 or in 2016, the Lynx was expected to begin flying suborbital space tourism flights and scientific research missions from a new spaceport on the Caribbean island of Curaçao. However, the company stated in January 2016 that they had not assigned a new projected date for test flights and a date for the launch of commercial operations could not be anticipated.

Because it lacked any propulsion system other than its rocket engines, the Lynx would have to be towed to the end of the runway. Once positioned on the runway, the pilot would have ignited the four rocket engines, take-off and begin a steep climb. The spacecraft would have experienced a little over four minutes of weightlessness before re-entering the Earth's atmosphere. The occupants of the Lynx were intended to have experienced up to four times normal gravity during re-entry. After re-entry, the Lynx would have glided down and performed an unpowered landing. The total flight time was projected to last about 30 minutes. The Lynx was expected to be able to perform 40 flights before maintenance was required.

Orbital Outfitters was reportedly designing pressure suits for XCOR use.  In 2012, Orbital Outfitters reported that they had completed a technical mockup of the Lynx craft itself.

Development cost projections 

See also 
 Private spaceflight
 EADS Astrium Space Tourism Project
 Rocketplane XP
 SpaceShipTwo
 New Shepard
 XCOR EZ-Rocket
 XCOR Mark-I X-Racer
 Chino Roque

References

External links 
 Lynx Suborbital Spacecraft Page
 Lynx Reusable Launch Vehicle Approaches Completion, AmericaSpace, November 2015.

Abandoned civil aircraft projects of the United States
Crewed spacecraft
Former proposed space launch system concepts
Low-wing aircraft
Mojave Air and Space Port
Proposed spacecraft
Rocket-powered aircraft
Space access
Space tourism
Spaceplanes
Tailless aircraft
XCOR Aerospace
XCOR aircraft